Jon Kennedy is a drummer and electronic musician who was born in Dukinfield, Greater Manchester, England.
He was discovered in 2000 when he passed a demo CD to Ninja Tune artist Mr Scruff. Scruff played tracks from the CD soon after on his "Unfold" radio show on Brighton's Juice 107.2. Brighton-based Tru Thoughts independent record label contacted Kennedy on hearing the tracks and signed him. Having recorded in Mr Scruff's Stockport studio, Kennedy now lives and records in Bristol, and regularly plays in both Bristol and London.

His first three 12" singles, and his debut album, We're Just Waiting For You Now were released between 2001 and 2002 on Tru Thoughts.
In 2002, Kennedy joined Grand Central Records, releasing his second album in 2003. The album featured collaborations with new label-mates Kate Rogers and Aim, whom he also toured with.
His third album, "Useless Wooden Toys" was released in 2005, on which he performed vocals on several tracks.

As a live act, he performs with a six piece band and plays drums himself.
The rest of the live band is made up of Dan Coggins on guitar, Ben Thomas on bass, Naomi Hart on keyboard, Sarah Scott on vocals and Bernard Moss of Pork Recordings on flute and alto sax.

Kennedy has also recorded under the aliases 777 and KRS Jon, and under the group name Snare Force One with fellow musician, Fletch.

In 2007, Kennedy started his own record label, The Jon Kennedy Federation. His first release on the new label is a 12" EP entitled Demons. In May 2007 he toured China as drummer for the band Kava Kava and remixed their song "Tic" for Chocolate Fireguard Records.

Discography 
Albums
 We're Just Waiting For You Now (1 April 2001)
 Take My Drum To England (25 August 2003)
 Useless Wooden Toys (4 April 2005)
 14 (2009)
 Strengthen the Roses (2012)
 Corporeal (2013)
 HA! (2017)
 Mmxx (2020)

12" Singles
 "Tell Me How You Feel" (27 November 2000)
 "No TV EP" (2001)
 "Chocolate And Cheese" (22 July 2002)
 "East Is East" (21 July 2003)
 "The Loafer" (21 July 2003)
 "Way I Feel" (12 April 2004)
 "On The Both Days" (3 March 2005)
 "Demons" (4 June 2007)

12" Remixes
 Barclay James Harvest - "Good Love Child" (EMI, 2008)
 DJ Sept - "Morning Comes" (Equinox Records, 2008)
 Evirgen - "Sudden" (Aber Records, 2007)
 Future Loop Foundation - "Experimentation" (Louisiana Recordings, 2007)
 Rough Edge Quartet - "Change" (TBC, 2007)
 Mr. Bambu - "Lunar Eclipse Style" (Organik Records, 2007)
 Watine - "Not A Pretence" (Catgang, 2007)
 Kava Kava - Tic (Chocolate Fireguard Records, 2007)
 Mod X - "Political Sun" 12" (Ice And Spice Records, 2006)
 Aldo Vanucci - "When I See You Smile" 12" (Catskills Records, 2004)
 The Baker Brothers - "Givson" from The Baker Brothers - Remixed 12" (Peddler, 2004)
 Fletch - "Heavy Stepper 7" (7 Hills Records, 2004)
 Dynamo Dresden - "In the End" from In The End (Remixes) 12" (Mada Music, 2003)
 Soul 'n' Soda - "Tomorrow" 12" (Stereo Deluxe, 2003)
 Mujaji - "Siempre" from The FourFlavors EP (Bastard Jazz Recordings, 2003)
 Aim - "The Girl Who Fell Through The Ice" 12" (Grand Central Records, 2002)
 Switchstance 12" (2003)
 Quantic - "Snakes In The Grass" from Apricot Morning 12" (Tru Thoughts, 2002)
 Hint - "Faderation" from "The Beau Selectah EP" (Deep-Water Records, 2002)
 Bonobo - "Dinosaurs" from One Offs... Remixes & B-Sides CD (Tru Thoughts, 2002)

References

External links 
Jon Kennedy's official site 
Jon Kennedy's Snare Force One Radio Show on www.samurai.fm
Jon Kennedy is music editor for Modart Magazine 
Jon Kennedy at Beijing Midi Festival

English drummers
British male drummers
English electronic musicians
Living people
Year of birth missing (living people)